Suzy Bittencourt de Oliveira, commonly known as Suzy, (born 7 February 1967) is a Brazilian football defender who played for the Brazil women's national football team. She competed at the 1996 Summer Olympics, playing 2 matches. At the club level, she played for Vasco da Gama.

See also
 Brazil at the 1996 Summer Olympics

References

External links
 
 Profile at sports-reference.com

1967 births
Living people
Brazilian women's footballers
Place of birth missing (living people)
Footballers at the 1996 Summer Olympics
Olympic footballers of Brazil
Women's association football defenders
Brazil women's international footballers
1995 FIFA Women's World Cup players